Richard Spicer (fl. 1414) was an English politician.

He was a Member (MP) of the Parliament of England for Huntingdon in April and November 1414. Beyond this, nothing is recorded of his life.

References

14th-century births
15th-century deaths
English MPs April 1414
English MPs November 1414